Leiostyla abbreviata is an extinct species of small air-breathing land snail, a terrestrial pulmonate gastropod mollusk in the family Lauriidae. It is one of several species sometimes referred as Madeiran land snail.

It is mentioned in annexes II and IV of Habitats Directive.

Leiostyla abbreviata was listed as Critically endangered in the 1996 IUCN Red List, but it is considered to be extinct.

Distribution
This species was endemic to Madeira, Portugal.

References

Extinct gastropods
Leiostyla
Taxa named by Richard Thomas Lowe
Gastropods described in 1852
Taxonomy articles created by Polbot